Alice Miller may refer to:
Alice Miller (politician) (born 1939), American politician in the state of Vermont
Alice Miller (psychologist) (1923–2010), Polish-born Swiss psychologist
Alice Miller (golfer) (born 1956), American golfer
Alice Miller (pilot), Israeli who successfully petitioned for the Israeli Air Force pilot course to be opened to women
Alice Duer Miller (1874–1942), American writer and poet
Alice D. G. Miller (1894–1985), American screenwriter
Alice L. Miller (born 1944), researcher, writer, and professor

See also
Allison Miller (disambiguation)